Thirteen is the fourth album by Scottish alternative rock band Teenage Fanclub, released in 1993 on Creation Records in the UK and Geffen in the US. It was commonly believed at the time that it was named after the song "Thirteen" by Big Star, a band that has heavily influenced Teenage Fanclub. The self-produced album was poorly received by critics on its release. It peaked at number 14 on the UK Albums Chart.

Background

Recording for the album began just a few weeks after finishing the Bandwagonesque tour in 1992. "It was difficult to make", guitarist Norman Blake said in 2018. "We went into the studio and we had 40 fragments of songs. Too much information, you know?" The band spent the next three to four months recording at Ca Va Sound Workshops in Glasgow, ending up with just fragmentary pieces that weren’t quite finished songs. From there, the band eventually decamped to Revolution Studios outside of Manchester for another two or three months working on the material. "We kept revising it, re-recording it, and just generally trying to improve it," said bassist Gerard Love. The number of songs were then trimmed down to the ones that made up Thirteen and its corresponding B-sides. "We were relatively happy with it," Blake said, "but we’d become a bit disillusioned."

Some of the album's song titles are working titles. Blake: "Very often what happens is we have working titles that we ended up keeping. That explains "Commercial Alternative" and "Norman 3" – that’s the third of my songs that we recorded for the album." In 2016, when asked about whether or not the album was named after the song "Thirteen" by Big Star, Blake said: "You know what? There were 13 songs on the record. But we were definitely listening to Big Star ... you can definitely hear Big Star’s influence in that music, along with a ton of other things at the time too." When asked about why Thirteen was his least favourite Teenage Fanclub album, Blake said: "I’d say the reasons are more circumstantial than musical. That was an album that took us a very, very long time to make. ... So it’s not that I have anything against the songs, it’s just when I think of making that album it wasn’t a very pleasant experience. It seemed like a lot of hard work."

Citing creative differences, drummer Brendan O'Hare left the band after touring for the album.

Album cover

Geffen's art department had offered to come up with an idea for the album's cover art. Blake: "So we said, "Sure, feel free. Obviously we’ll have to think about what you come up with, but send us some ideas." A few months later the band received "this image of a girl crying with mascara running in a white t-shirt with a 13 on it." The band, however, rejected the idea as they didn't feel it represented the music. "I think they were trying to market us to teenage girls", Blake said. "But we ended up having to pay them ten grand, because they got a photographer, a studio, and models. They had to pay them off." In the end, the band put together the sleeve themselves.  Blake: "Jeff Koons did an art piece with a basketball suspended in water, which I liked the look of, so I thought I’d just rip that off because he does that with other people’s ideas."

Reception

At the time of release, Thirteen received mostly negative reviews. Music critic Robert Christgau gave it a "neither" rating, indicating that an album "may impress once or twice with consistent craft or an arresting track or two. Then it won't." Spin denounced Teenage Fanclub for making "a fetish of smothering emotion under a blanket of stoic formalism." Rolling Stone, however, called the album "even sweeter than its predecessor" and praised the band as "among the best recyclers [of power pop and bubblegum rock] around." Musician called it "great ear candy that we may one day learn is also nutritious."

Retrospective reviews have been generally positive. AllMusic called it "an eminently worthy follow-up to the classic Bandwagonesque" and Pitchfork wrote: "To this day, its reputation is far worse than the actual music."

Track listing

Note
The four tracks on the limited edition bonus disc were recorded in June 1993 for BBC Radio 1's The Evening Session.

Personnel

Teenage Fanclub

Norman Blake – vocals, guitar
Gerard Love – vocals, bass
Raymond McGinley – vocals, guitar
Brendan O'Hare – drums

Additional musicians

Iain MacDonald – flute (1)
John McCusker – violin (1)
Mike Hare – slide guitar (2)
Joe McAlinden – violin (2, 7, 10), alto saxophone (8)

Technical
Teenage Fanclub – producer
Andy MacPherson – producer, engineer
Darrin Tidsey – assistant engineer
Andy Lee – assistant engineer
Tony Doogan – assistant engineer
Duncan Cameron – assistant engineer
Paul Chisholm – assistant engineer
Tim Young – mastering engineer 
Brian Spanklen – cover photography
Dennis Keeley – band photography
Mark Bown – sleeve layout

Charts

Notes

References

Teenage Fanclub albums
1993 albums
Creation Records albums
Geffen Records albums